Frank "Muddy" Waters Stadium is located in south-central Michigan in the town of Hillsdale and is home to the Hillsdale Chargers football team.  The Chargers are an NCAA Division II college football team and compete as a member of the Great Midwest Athletic Conference.  The stadium is owned and operated by Hillsdale College.

The facility is named in honor of College Football Hall of Fame coach Frank "Muddy" Waters who led the Chargers to a 138–47–5 record from 1954 through 1973.  The stadium has an official seating capacity of 8,500.

References

College football venues
Hillsdale Chargers football
American football venues in Michigan
Sports venues completed in 1947
1947 establishments in Michigan